The 2004 season in Swedish football, starting January 2004 and ending December 2004:

Events 
 19 May 2004: Valencia wins the UEFA Cup final against Marseille which was played on Ullevi Stadium, Gothenburg.
 22 June 2004: Sweden qualify for the quarterfinals of the Euro 2004 tournament in Portugal after beating Bulgaria 5–0, drawing Italy 1–1 and in the final group stage game, playing 2–2 against Denmark, a result which ensured both Scandinavian teams a place in the final stage.
 26 June 2004: The Netherlands knocks Sweden out of the European Championships as they win the penalty shootout after 0–0 in both full-time and extra time.
 23 September 2004: IF Elfsborg ends IFK Göteborg's winning streak of seven consecutive won games starting August 3.
 4 October 2004: IFK Göteborg celebrates its 100th birthday with a 2–0 win against Djurgårdens IF.
 18 October 2004: The game between AIK and Hammarby IF is interrupted (and not started again until after 55 minutes) as AIK fans causes trouble on their part of Råsunda.
 24 October 2004: Örgryte IS wins 3–0 against AIK, which means that AIK will be relegated to Superettan. The match was played with empty terraces due to the behaviour of the AIK supporters the previous round.
 30 October 2004: Malmö FF wins their 15th title after passing Halmstads BK in the last round of Allsvenskan as they beat IF Elfsborg 1–0 while Halmstad, that would have taken the gold with a win, only managed to play 1–1 against IFK Göteborg.
 8 November 2004: The licensing committee of the Swedish Football Association denies Örebro SK the licence needed (called Elitlicensen) to play in Allsvenskan due to the club's bad economy. Örebro SK immediately appeals against the decision.
 11 November 2004: The first round of the first edition of Royal League is played. The four top teams from Sweden, Norway and Denmark compete to win the title Scandinavian Champions.
 3 December 2004: Örebro SK's appeal is denied, and they will play in Superettan the 2005 season.

Honours

Official titles

Competitions

Promotions, relegations and qualifications

Promotions

Relegations

International qualifications

Domestic results

Allsvenskan

2004 Allsvenskan qualification play-off

Superettan

2004 Svenska Cupen 
Quarter-finals

Semi-finals

Final

National team results

Notes

References 
Print

Online

 
Seasons in Swedish football